John Patrick Leahy (7 March 1941 – 23 November 1980) was an Australian rules footballer who played two games for Melbourne during the 1961 season of the Victorian Football League (VFL).

Early life 
John Leahy was born in Geelong, Victoria to Alfred Ernest Leahy and Kathleen Leahy (née Gehrig) on 7 March 1941. He was one of four brothers, two of which also played for Melbourne during the 1960s – Brian played in the 1960 Melbourne Premiership team while Terry won Melbourne's best and fairest in 1966.

Football career 
Leahy joined his brother Brian at Melbourne in 1961, wearing the number 30 guernsey.  He played two games – The Round 12 draw with Fitzroy and the Round 13 loss to Hawthorn.

Later life 
At age 21 John married Nancy Faye Arthur and later had two children – Philip and Rodney.

John Leahy died in North Melbourne on 22 November 1981.  He was cremated three days later.

See also 
List of Australian rules football families

References

External links

1941 births
1980 deaths
Australian rules footballers from Victoria (Australia)
Melbourne Football Club players